Wazir often refers to:
 Vizier or wazir, a high-ranking political advisor or minister

Wazir may also refer to:

Places
 Wazirabad, a City in Punjab, Pakistan
 Waziristan, a region in tribal belt of Khyber Pakhtunkhwa, Pakistan
 Wazir Akbar Khan (Kabul), a neighborhood in Kabul, Afghanistan
 Wazir, Nangarhar, a village in Khogyani District, Afghanistan

Other uses
 Wazir (chess), a fairy chess piece that moves one space in an orthogonal direction
 Wazir (film), a 2016 Bollywood film starring Amitabh Bachchan and Farhan Akhtar
 Wazir (Pashtun tribe), a tribe in Waziristan, Pakistan
 Wazir (Khogyani clan), a tribe in Nangarhar Province, Afghanistan
 Waziri language, a language spoken in Waziristan region of Pakistan
 Wazir Khan Mosque, a mosque in Lahore, Punjab, Pakistan

People with the name
 Wazir Khan (Lahore), 17th-century court physician to Shah Jahan
 Wazir Khan (Sirhind) (died 1710), governor of Sirhind in the Mughal Empire
 Wazir Ali Khan (1780–1817), fourth nawab of Awadh, India
 Wazir Akbar Khan (1816–1845), an Afghan prince, general, and emir
 Wazir Arsala Khan, Foreign Minister of Afghanistan in 1869
 Wazir Ali (1903–1950), India Test cricketer
 Wazir Mohammad (born 1929), former Pakistani cricketer
 Haji Wazir (Bagram detainee), a detainee at Bagram who had a writ of habeas corpus filed on his behalf
 Ali Wazir, Pakistani politician and leader of the Pashtun Tahafuz Movement
 Arif Wazir, Pakistani politician and leader of the Pashtun Tahafuz Movement
 Mir Kalam (Mir Kalam Khan Wazir), Pakistani politician and leader of the Pashtun Tahafuz Movement
 Khalil al-Wazir (1935–1988), Palestinian military leader and senior aide of Yasser Arafat
 Khalid Wazir (born 1936), former Pakistani cricketer
 Abdullah Wazir (born 1979), one of the Afghan detainees at Guantanamo Bay
 Wazir Mohammed Khan (died October 14, 1974), an Indian actor who acted in many movies including the first Indian talkie Alam Ara (1931)
 Safiya Wazir, American politician
 Usman Wazeer, Pakistani boxer
 Wazir Baig, Pakistani politician and former speaker of Gilgit Baltistan Assembly

See also
 Waziri (disambiguation)

Arabic-language surnames
Arabic masculine given names